Ernest Riles (born October 2, 1960) is an American former professional baseball shortstop and third baseman. From 1985 through 1993, Riles played for the Milwaukee Brewers (1985–1988), San Francisco Giants (1988–1990), Oakland Athletics (1991), Houston Astros (1992) and Boston Red Sox (1993) of the Major League Baseball (MLB). He batted left-handed and threw right-handed.

Career
Riles grew up in Georgia where he was the youngest child in a family of ten boys and one girl. He played baseball his entire life and idolized Bert Campaneris as a child. He attended Bainbridge High School in Bainbridge, Georgia where he was coached by John Palermo.

He was signed by the Milwaukee Brewers in the 1981 Major League Baseball Draft. In 1983, he led the Texas League in batting average (.349), on-base percentage (.450) and OPS (.958), being promoted to Triple-A Pacific Coast League the next year. 
 
Riles debuted with the Brewers in the 1985 mid-season. In his first major league stint, he hit .286 and finished third in the American League Rookie of the Year vote behind Ozzie Guillén and Teddy Higuera. 
 
After frequent trips to the disabled list, Riles was traded from the Brewers to the San Francisco Giants for Jeffrey Leonard on June 8, 1988. The Giants were in need of infield roster depth at the time. He belted the 10,000th home run in Giants history during a 21–2 rout of the Cardinals. Riles played in the 1989 World Series as a member of the Giants. Riles started the first two games of the World Series as the Designated Hitter for the Giants.

Riles also played with Oakland and Houston, and ended his major league career with the Boston Red Sox in the 1993 season.

In a nine-season major league career, Riles was a .254 hitter with 48 home runs and 284 run batted in in 919 games played.

References

External links

Ernest Riles Baseball Biography
The Baseball Page

1960 births
Living people
African-American baseball players
American expatriate baseball players in Canada
Baseball players from Georgia (U.S. state)
Boston Red Sox players
Buffalo Bisons (minor league) players
El Paso Diablos players
Houston Astros players
Major League Baseball shortstops
Major League Baseball third basemen
Middle Georgia Warriors baseball players
Milwaukee Brewers players
Oakland Athletics players
Pawtucket Red Sox players
San Francisco Giants players
Stockton Ports players
Tennessee Tomahawks players
Tucson Toros players
Vancouver Canadians players
21st-century African-American people
20th-century African-American sportspeople